RC2 or RC-2 may refer to:

 FIA RC2, a class of rally racing car used for Group Rally2
 RC2 (originally Ron's Code 2, later Rivest Cipher 2), a symmetric key block cipher designed by Ron Rivest
 RC2 Corporation, a U.S. toy company
 Rc2, a variant of the SJ Rc electric locomotive
 Republic RC-2 Rainbow, an unbuilt 1940s airliner
 Software release candidate 2

See also

 RC (disambiguation)
 R2C (disambiguation)
 RCC (disambiguation)
 RCRC (disambiguation)